Zieria floydii, commonly known as the Floyd's zieria, is a plant in the citrus family Rutaceae and is endemic to the New England Tableland in New South Wales. It is an erect shrub with warty, hairy branches, three-part, clover-like leaves and clusters of creamy-white flowers with four petals and four stamens.

Description
Its younger branches are densely covered with warty lumps and star-like hairs, including on the warts. The leaflets are slightly warty-hairy on the upper surface and densely warty on the lower surface with the mid-vein covered with star-like hairs.

The clusters are shorter than the leaves. There are four stamens. Flowering occurs mainly in November.

Taxonomy and naming
Zieria floydii was first formally described in 2002 by James Armstrong from a specimen collected near Big Scrub Creek in the Guy Fawkes River National Park. The description was published in Australian Systematic Botany. The specific epithet (floydii) honours the Australian botanist, Alex Floyd who collected the type specimen.

Distribution and habitat
Floyd's zieria is only known from the Guy Fawkes and Chaelundi National Parks where it mostly grows on the margins of dry rainforest, sometimes in wet forest or heath.

Conservation
This zieria is listed as "Endangered" under the New South Wales Threatened Species Conservation Act and under the Commonwealth Government Environment Protection and Biodiversity Conservation Act 1999 (EPBC) Act. Some of the threats to the species are inappropriate fire regimes, grazing by feral goats (Capra hircus) and land clearing.

References

floydii
Sapindales of Australia
Flora of New South Wales
Plants described in 2002